There are four types of elections in Wales: elections to the House of Commons of the United Kingdom, elections to the devolved Senedd (Welsh Parliament), local elections to the 22 principal areas, and the Police and Crime Commissioner elections, in addition to by-elections for each aforementioned election. Elections are held on Election Day, which is conventionally a Thursday. Since the passing of the Fixed-term Parliaments Act 2011 for UK general elections, all four types of elections are held after fixed periods, though early elections to the UK parliament can occur in certain situations, with Senedd elections being postponed to avoid elections to the UK parliament and Senedd coinciding with each other.

The three electoral systems used for elections in Wales are: first-past-the-post (for UK elections and local elections, though individual local authorities are able to move to STV under recent Welsh legislation), the additional member system (for Senedd elections) and the supplementary vote (for Police and Crime Commissioner elections; although proposals by the UK Government to change PCC elections to FPTP have been made).

Local government elections

There are elections to 22 unitary authorities across Wales every four years, most recently on 5 May 2022. The electoral system used is first-past-the-post. The largest unitary authorities in Wales are Cardiff, Newport and Swansea councils, which all lie in the southern coastal belt.

 The next Welsh local elections are scheduled for 2027
 Local election results 2022
 Local election results 2017
 Local election results 2012
 Local election results 2008
 Local election results 2004
 Local election results 1999
 Local election results 1995
 Local election results 1993

Police and crime commissioner elections 

Police and crime commissioners were established in England and Wales, replacing the local police authorities, following the Conservative–Liberal Democrat coalition agreement of 2010, with the first Police and crime commissioners elected in 2012.

 2021 England and Wales police and crime commissioner elections
 2016 England and Wales police and crime commissioner elections
 2012 England and Wales police and crime commissioner elections

Devolved parliament elections

There have been six elections to the devolved parliament of Wales, based in Cardiff Bay since 1999. These elections are held every five years to elect sixty Members of the Senedd (MSs; formerly Assembly Members, ASs). Voters have two votes: forty MSs are elected by the First Past the Post system in individual constituencies, and a further twenty MSs are elected by a regional top-up system in which voters vote by region. The regions are: Mid and West Wales, North Wales, South Wales Central, South Wales East and South Wales West, whereas the constituencies are the same used for elections to the UK parliament. Each region elects four MSs, to achieve approximately proportional representation overall, with every individual in Wales being represented by five MSs in total, their local constituency MS and four regional MSs. Between its inception in 1999, it was known as the 'National Assembly for Wales'. Legislation was passed in 2020, for a name change on 6 May 2020 to its current name, 'Senedd Cymru' or the 'Welsh Parliament' (or simply 'Senedd') to fully reflect its constitutional status as a law-making and tax-setting parliament. It is based in Cardiff Bay, initially (as the Assembly) in Tŷ Hywel from 1999 to 2006, until it moved to the Senedd building, which opened on 1 March 2006, where the Assembly and now Senedd has been based since 2006. The elections were held every four years from 1999, but were increased to five years following the Wales Act 2014 for the 2016 election.

The 2021 Senedd election on 6 May 2021, was the first election to the devolved parliament since its name change. The election took place akin to previous elections when it was known as the National Assembly for Wales.

as the Senedd

Elections to the institution prior to 2020, with the last being in 2016, were done under the previous name the 'National Assembly for Wales' (see below). Following legislation in 2020, any subsequent elections, from the 2021 Senedd election will be under its new name.

2026 

The next Senedd election is expected to be held on Thursday 7 May 2026, under the provisions of the Wales Act 2014 where Senedd terms are five-year terms. This date can be postponed under circumstances including public health or safety emergencies, or an early UK parliamentary election (itself expected in 2024, but can be held prior).

2021

It was the sixth general election since the establishment of the institution in 1999. It was held along with the other 2021 United Kingdom local elections and was the first election where 16 and 17-year-olds were allowed to vote in Wales, which is the largest extension of the franchise in Wales since 1969. Both changes were a result of the Senedd and Elections (Wales) Bill 2019.

Overall turnout: 46.5%

as the National Assembly for Wales (1999–2020)

Elections to the then 'National Assembly for Wales' (or Welsh Assembly') occurred from its first election in 1999 up until the 2016 election (with any subsequent elections being as the 'Senedd'). This follows the 1997 devolution referendum where Welsh voters narrowly approved the formation of the devolved institution. The institution is now known as the Senedd (Welsh Parliament) (see above).

2016

Overall turnout: 45.3%

2011

Overall turnout: 42.2%

2007

Overall turnout: 43.7%

2003

Overall turnout: 38.2%

1999

Overall turnout: 46%

Past elections and referendums

UK parliament elections

Wales has been eligible to send MPs to Westminster since the Laws in Wales Act 1535. Between then and 1885, most constituencies were categorised as county or borough constituencies; each sent one MP to Westminster. As the Industrial Revolution took hold there were many calls for reform (particularly in towns such as Merthyr Tydfil). Parliament eventually allowed the new towns to vote, and this introduced the first Labour MPs. The first leader of the Labour Party in Parliament, Keir Hardie, was one of the two MPs for Merthyr Tydfil. The following table shows the composition of Wales' Westminster MPs since 1885.

Detailed breakdowns

2019

2017

2015

2010

2005

2001

1997

1992

1987

1983

European Parliament
Wales was a constituency in European Parliament elections. Following the United Kingdom's exit from the European Union on 31 January 2020, Wales no longer elects representatives to the European Parliament.

2019

2019 opinion polls

2014

2009

2004

1999

1994

1989

1984

1979

See also 
 Elections in the United Kingdom
 Elections in England
 Elections in Northern Ireland
 Elections in Scotland

References